C.A. Gray Jr High School (also called Charlie A. Grey, Jr. High School) is a public high school/middle school in Moultrie, Georgia, United States, which was established in 1956. It serves Moultrie and part of Omega.

C.A. Gray is a member of the Georgia High School Association and Region 1-AAAAA and the South Georgia Athletic Conference for athletic competition.  The school's mascot is the Packers and its colors are gold and black.

Athletics
The interscholastic sports program at C. A. Gray Jr. High School offers: 
baseball
basketball
cheerleading
cross-country
diving
football
golf
gymnastics
marching band
rifle team
soccer
softball
swimming
tennis
track
wrestling

Any student who wishes to participate in a school sports program must have a physical exam (free of charge during the summer) and is encouraged to purchase the school's insurance.

Band
The band program is an important part of C.A. Gray Jr. High School. The junior high school band contains many auxiliaries for participation and performance, such as district and all-state band.

Band Director:
Jacob Thompson

Choir
The Choral Department at C.A. Gray Jr. High School offers all students an opportunity to participate in a music activity. Students are graded on improvement and not on talent. The choirs perform at various occasions for the public and at choral festivals.

Choral Director: 
E. Miller

Namesake 
C.A. Gray Jr High is named takes its name from one of Moultrie's dedicated educators, Miss Charlie A. Gray. She was born in 1902, and received a B.S. Degree in Education from the Tuskegee Institute.

References

External links
new site

Schools in Colquitt County, Georgia
Public high schools in Georgia (U.S. state)